The 2014 Chorley Borough Council election took place on 22 May 2014 to elect members of Chorley Borough Council in England. This was on the same day as other local elections.   One third of the council was up for election and the Labour party held control.

Council make-up
After the election, the composition of the council was:

Election result

Results map

Wards

Adlington and Anderton

Astley and Buckshaw ward

Chisnall ward

Chorley East ward

Chorley North East ward

Chorley North West ward

Chorley South East ward

Chorley South West ward

Clayton le Woods and Whittle le Woods ward

Clayton le Woods North ward

Clayton le Woods West and Cuerden ward

Coppull ward

Eccleston and Mawdesley ward

Euxton North ward

Euxton South ward

Pennine

Wheelton and Withnell ward

References

2014
2014 English local elections
2010s in Lancashire